NH 135 may refer to:

 National Highway 135 (India)
 New Hampshire Route 135, United States